Pon Kumaran (also credited as P. Kumar) is an Indian film writer and director working predominantly in Kannada and Tamil films. He made his directorial debut with the blockbuster Kannada film Vishnuvardhana (2011) which got rave reviews and earned him many awards including a nomination at the Filmfare Awards. He has also penned the story and dialogues for the Rajinikanth starrer Lingaa (2014).

Personal life
Kumaran is a Chennai based filmmaker and writer who worked as an assistant to many leading directors before making his own stint as an independent director.

Filmography

References

External links

Pon Kumaran profile
Pon Kumaran teams up with Sharan again

Living people
Kannada film directors
Tamil film directors
Tamil screenwriters
Film directors from Chennai
21st-century Indian film directors
Screenwriters from Chennai
Telugu film directors
Bengali screenwriters
21st-century Indian dramatists and playwrights
Year of birth missing (living people)
21st-century Indian screenwriters